The 2020 Strat 200 was the 2nd stock car race of the 2020 NASCAR Gander RV & Outdoors Truck Series season and the 24th iteration of the event. The race was held on February 21, 2020 at Las Vegas Motor Speedway in North Las Vegas, Nevada. Kyle Busch, driving for his own team Kyle Busch Motorsports, would win the event leading 108 laps, his first of the season and his 57th overall in the NASCAR Gander RV and Outdoors Truck Series. Johnny Sauter of ThorSport Racing and Austin Hill of Hattori Racing Enterprises would take 2nd and 3rd, respectively.

Background 
Las Vegas Motor Speedway, located in Clark County, Nevada outside the Las Vegas city limits and about 15 miles northeast of the Las Vegas Strip, is a 1,200-acre (490 ha) complex of multiple tracks for motorsports racing. The complex is owned by Speedway Motorsports, Inc., which is headquartered in Charlotte, North Carolina.

35 trucks would enter the race, meaning that three would not qualify for the race.

Practice 
The first and final practice took place on February 21, 2020. Christian Eckes would set the fastest time with a 30.363.

Final practice results

Qualifying 
The drivers of Josh Reaume, Natalie Decker, Spencer Boyd, Angela Ruch, and Josh Bilicki would all qualify by owner's points, with notable examples of Bilicki being almost 5 seconds slower than the slowest non-quaiflier, and Ruch being 3 seconds slower. Bayley Currey, Korbin Forrister, and Jennifer Jo Cobb would all not qualify for the race.

Angela Ruch and Parker Kilgerman argument on Twitter 
Controversy would occur after qualifying, when Angela Ruch, driving for Reaume Brothers Racing, spun on the apron while going onto the track for her warmup lap. Driver and commentator Parker Kligerman would react to the spin on Twitter, saying "Let's raise the qualification standards for the top 3 series. Side note: I can't wait till a woman driver absolutely laps the field one day. Truly, we are the only sport men and women can compete on equal grounds. Can't wait till super talented women are throughout the field." In response, Angela would say on Twitter that she blew a tire during her lap in a swear-word fueled tirade, while also insulting Kilgerman by saying "Dip shit! I blew a tire! The deference between me and u little b:;$&&$ is I make my own path !! In fact if u do not shut your trap I will slap your little ass! Sad little fellas that no one dated in high school !" After harsh criticism to the tweet, Angela would say that the comment made on her Twitter was made by her husband, Mike Ruch, saying "Mike always has my back and I'm thankful for that! However I’ve decided to get him his own twitter so he can feel free to speak his mind 😳😂 Have fun everyone it's @mf_ruch @Twitter will never be the same! I'll keep my head down and keep digging! Thanks everyone!" 

The original tweet Mike Ruch made is now deleted.

Full qualifying results

Race

Pre-race ceremonies 
For pre-race ceremonies, the Nellis Air Force Base Honor Guard would present the nation's colors. Billy Maudin, chaplain from the Christian racing ministry Motor Racing Outreach would give out the invocation. Bridgette Foster would sing the national anthem. Kaui Kalahiki, Director of Facilities at The Strat, would give the starting command.

Race recap

Post-race driver comments

Race results 
Stage 1 Laps: 30

Stage 2 Laps: 30

Stage 3 Laps: 74

References 

February 2020 sports events in the United States
2020 in sports in Nevada
NASCAR races at Las Vegas Motor Speedway
2020 NASCAR Gander RV & Outdoors Truck Series